Hollywood Boulevard Commercial and Entertainment District consists of twelve blocks between the 6200 and 7000 blocks of Hollywood Boulevard in Los Angeles. This strip of commercial and retail businesses is recognized for its historical significance and was entered into the National Register of Historic Places in 1984.

Description
Home to the sites of some of Hollywood's earliest movie theaters and lavish movie palaces (many of which are still standing and date back to the early 1900s), the district's boundaries encompass over 100 buildings serving commercial, retail, and entertainment related businesses that sit between Argyle Avenue and El Centro Boulevard along Hollywood Boulevard in Los Angeles, California. With its array of theaters which catered to the local film industry along with its close proximity to major film production studios, the region is generally known for its significant role in the history of cinema. Although the region's visual landscape has in many ways changed since its early days, with many of the strip's original buildings demolished, remodeled beyond recognition (as exemplified by the Hollywood Theater building whose original 1913 Romanesque edifice once featured corinthian columns) or relocated (as was the case with the old Hollywood Branch Library), the 12 block district is recognized for its remarkable concentration of relatively preserved historically, culturally, and architecturally significant landmarks. Much of this district's historical value is owed to the preservation of its landmarks whose edifices serve as prime examples of the various architectural trends and movements which flourished during the early 20th century and the "Golden Age of Hollywood" in particular.
 
Some of the district's most well known structures include Hollywood's world famous movie theaters such as Grauman's Chinese Theatre and Egyptian Theatre which both feature Exotic Revival architecture. The district's existing eclectic range of popular 20th century architectural styles also include the Italian Renaissance Revival style (and East Indian influence) exemplified by The Hollywood Pacific Theatre building (erected in 1928) and the particularly prominent colorful and progressive Art Deco style whose distinguishing architectural characteristics are exemplified by the Newbury building and the famous The Pantages Theater, among others. Erected in 1930 and considered to be the last great movie palace built in Hollywood, The Pantages theatre building has managed to retain its ersatz stone facade and original detailing with metal zigzag window frames and sculpted goddesses. The Equitable Building of Hollywood, a late Gothic Revival and Art Deco style 1929 office building is also a Los Angeles Historic-Cultural Monument The Hollywood Theatre building holds particular historical architectural significance in that it lays claim to brandishing the country's first neon-lit, triangular marquee in response to the automobile boom of the 1930s. 

Other significant architectural styles found on this particular strip of Hollywood Boulevard include Classical Revival and Spanish Colonial Revival. Ever since the area was transformed from a quiet residential neighborhood to a vibrant and bustling commercial district known as the entertainment capital of the world that holds both national and global culture shaping influence, the district has predominately consisted of a combination of retail and commercial businesses and most notably, theaters and movie palaces of architectural and cultural significance. Built around three commercial nodes, this eclectic mix of businesses is reflected in the coexistence of small scale structures alongside some of Los Angeles’ earliest high rise buildings. Examples of Classical Revival or Beaux Arts structures found in this district include the Taft Building, the Guaranty Building, and the Hollywood Masonic Temple. This style is majorly associated with the district's financial and professional buildings that adorn its major intersections which include the intersections of Hollywood Blvd/Cahuenga and Hollywood Blvd/Highland. 
A notable example of the Spanish Baroque style can be seen in the lavish façade and structure of the El Capitan Theater 

Also observed within the district's boundaries is the French Chatauesque style which is largely associated with the area's smaller, retail structures. Italianate beaux is yet another architectural style present in the district and can be found exemplified by the Hollywood Pacific Theater. Despite the structural changes much of Hollywood Boulevard's edifices have undergone since the first half of the 20th century, much of this particular strip of Hollywood Boulevard has retained its architectural integrity and can be considered a microcosm which displays the varied architectural styles and accomplishments of some of Los Angeles’ most notable architects. Notable architects who have made significant contributions to the character and visual aesthetic of the district include such names as Walker and Eisen, John C. Austin, Parkinson and Parkinson, Curlett and Beelman, Morgan, Walls, and Clement, Gogerty and Weil, S. Charles Lee, B. Marcus Priteca, Meyer and Holler, and Kremple and Erkes.

Another significantly unique visual feature of this district are the original Hollywood Metropolitan street lights that were developed specifically for the Hollywood neighborhood and which garnish the district's portion of the Hollywood Walk of Fame.

History
Hollywood Boulevard was originally called Prospect Avenue. John Bower, a miner from the Sierra foothills, who purchased a small government parcel at the intersection of Pass Road (today's Ivar Avenue) and Prospect in 1872, named the street. Daeida and Harvey Wilcox would purchase Bower's tract of land in the mid 1880s.  By 1900, Prospect was still a small country dirt road surrounded by lemon orchards and vegetable fields. Although mostly homes, several establishments sprouted up along the street. The Sackett Hotel, a three-story bed and breakfast spot as well as home to the city's first post office. For a time it was the tallest building in the area, located on Cahuenga Boulevard and Prospect. The Hollywood Memorial Church stood at the corner of Prospect and Vine from 1903 to 1923. The original Hollywood Hotel opened in 1902, and would take up much of the acreage surrounding Prospect and Highland. The hotel was a stomping ground for all famous silent movie stars. Today, the Hollywood and Highland shopping center, including the Dolby Theatre, which hosts the Academy Awards, stands in place of the former hotel.

The Los Angeles Gas Company installed the city's first gas meters in 1904, which allowed for the appearance of street numbers.  After Hollywood's annexation from Los Angeles in 1910, the 100 block of Hollywood Boulevard became the 6400 block. Hollywood's Board of Trustees officially renamed Prospect Avenue to Hollywood Boulevard on January 5, 1910.

The Golden Age of Hollywood Boulevard

Much of the district's historical landmarks were erected between 1913 and 1935 during the rapid boom of the film industry.Those migrating west in the film industry saw the vast open land in Hollywood as a promising location for studios.  Charles E. Toberman, a real estate mogul and the nephew of three-term Los Angeles Mayor, John Toberman, predicted that Hollywood Boulevard would be a mecca for entertainment.  He sold vacant land with the promise that "Hollywood is at a threshold of a new era of development."
This period of growth included the grand opening of The Hollywood Theater in 1913 (which stands as the oldest existing theater in the district today), as well as the area's first four-story building located at Highland and Hollywood, that included street level stores, offices, and apartment units at the top.  Wilcox and Hollywood Boulevard welcomed Wright's ice cream store, the precursor to the obsolete Wil Wright's chain of ice cream parlors, which were sprinkled throughout southern California up until the 1970s.
The block between Cahuenga and Wilcox would be the first completely commercial block along Hollywood Boulevard.

The 1920s saw the rise of taller buildings sprouting up along the boulevard.  The new legal city height limit was 12 stories.  During this decade, the Taft Building (Los Angeles) would take the place of the old Hollywood memorial Church at Hollywood and Vine.  The original Hollywood Athletic Club was located on the corner of Hollywood and Cahuenga Boulevard. The Hollywood Masonic Temple building, now the home of the El Capitan Entertainment Centre, was established in 1922.  For a time this site was most famous for holding the memorial service of film director D.W. Griffith in 1948.
John's Cafe was the first restaurant to open along the boulevard.  It was located in Wilcox Hall and became a staple for Hollywood's industry workers.  Charlie Chaplin often frequented the café for hot apple pie.  Other popular restaurants soon followed such as Armstrong Carlton Cafe, since demolished, and Musso and Frank's, the oldest existing restaurant in Hollywood, still located at 6667 Hollywood Boulevard.

The Montmartre Cafe, once located at 6755 Hollywood Boulevard becamer the city's first nightclub, and entertained stars like Rudolph Valentino and Joan Crawford.  Bing Crosby, who was a singer with Paul Whitman's band, made his Hollywood debut here. Over the next ten years, many more nightclubs would open throughout the city, making the city of Hollywood a popular evening destination.

The Pig 'n Whistle, located at 6714 Hollywood Boulevard, opened in 1927.  The restaurant was one of the first to market their specific brand, selling souvenir menus, coloring books, paper masks, and a storybook that provided the background of each pig that was to be served for lunch and dinner.

Four of Hollywood's most famous theaters were built during this period. Warner Hollywood Theater, now Hollywood Pacific Theatre opened in 1927, housed in a four-story old Italian Renaissance building, and located at 6433 Hollywood Boulevard. This theater exhibited Warner Brothers films including Casablanca.   Sid Grauman, whose family was established in the theater business in San Francisco, teamed with C. E. Tolberman to erect the first movie palace along the boulevard.  In 1922,Grauman's Egyptian Theatre opened.  The El Capitan Theatre and Chinese Theatre followed in 1926 and 1927.  Subsequently, Tolberman would complete the Hollywood Roosevelt Hotel in May 1927, which remains the oldest running hotel in Los Angeles. The largest and final movie palace, the Pantages Theater (Hollywood), would open on June 4, 1930.

Otherwise, Hollywood's investors were hit hard by the stock market crash of 1920.  Many established retail operations folded as a result of the depression.  Plans for many future developments were scrapped altogether.  However, the film industry was still going strong, attracting tourists and budding actors.  Much like modern day, the Hollywood Boulevard of the early 1930s welcomed psychic healers and other various osteopathic practitioners, while attracting a multitude of eccentrics and vagrants.  However, during this period, architect S. Charles Lee, restyled much of the street, giving the facades a much needed makeover to repair the seediness from the past years.  To atone for the stock market crash, Hollywood Boulevard merchants hoped to grow business by offering "Dollar Days in Hollywood" and promoting their street as the "World's Largest Department Store." Retail stores would use their proximity to Hollywood's elite to attract customers.

This strip of Hollywood Boulevard continues to be a prime shopping destination.  The Hollywood and Highland Center, has more than twenty-five eateries, twenty retail shops, a multi-theatre cineplex and Loews Hollywood hotel.  The desire to bring the Academy Awards back to its original home, Hollywood, led to the $94-million Kodak Theatre project, a theatre specifically designed to host the annual show. Renamed the Dolby Theatre in 2012, this venue also hosts other live shows throughout the year.  
The Hollywood and Vine intersection now includes the addition of the W Hollywood Hotel.  Like many of the blocks within this district, there are several street level dining options with hundreds of residential homes and offices in the floors above.

References 	

National Register of Historic Places in Los Angeles County, California
Buildings and structures completed in 1915